The 1961 population census in Bosnia and Herzegovina was the ninth census of the population of Bosnia and Herzegovina. The Socialist Federal Republic of Yugoslavia conducted a population census on 31 March 1961. 3,277,935 people populated the territory of Socialist Republic of Bosnia and Herzegovina.

Overall

References 

Censuses in Bosnia and Herzegovina
1961 in Bosnia and Herzegovina
Bosnia and Herzegovina